The Ravenous is a 2003 horror novel written by T. M. Gray. It is Gray's second published novel. 

The Ravenous is about a rural Maine town where most of the adult citizens are members of a human-sacrificial cult. The plot involves a teenager who discovers the horrifying truth about his town.

Inspiration 
In an interview in The Chronicle, Issue 31 , T. M. Gray states: "If Jaws made you afraid to go in the water, and Psycho made you afraid of taking a shower, I wouldn't suggest a woodland hike after reading this novel!"

Plot summary 
The Ravenous introduces us to Eddie Spears, a teenager who is into video games and hanging out with his best friend, Jess Brown. Eddie has a problem: he can hear distant whispers and this causes severe headaches. When he discovers the true cause for his town's prosperity: a sacrificial pseudo-Druid cult, Eddie comes to realize he has a special gift—but can he use it in time to save his sister's life?

2003 American novels
American horror novels
Novels set in Maine